Ekangi is a 2002 Indian Kannada-language film written, directed by and starring Ravichandran. He also wrote film's screenplay and composed the music. The film stars Ramya Krishna and Prakash Raj, with Vanitha Vasu, Sridhar, Ramesh Bhat and Sadhu Kokila in supporting roles. With the film, Ravichandran's reputation as an experimenter grew, having erected a house of  80 lakh exclusively for the film and spending heavily in filming song sequences, an unusual trend in Kannada cinema during the time. It was also the first in Kannada and second Indian film to employ SFX sound system.

The film received warm reviews from film critics and won five awards at the 2001–02 Karnataka State Film Awards including the award for Second Best Film and Best Actor (Ravichandran). It was an ambitious project, but failed to succeed at the box-office, even though following the audience's hostile response after its theatrical release, almost 20 scenes were re-shot and re-edited before re-releasing it with censor acceptance. Ravichandran was said to have suffered a loss of  2 crore owing to the film's commercial failure.

Cast
 Ravichandran as Ravi
 Ramya Krishna
 Prakash Rai
 Vanitha Vasu
 Sridhar
 Soori
 Master Vinay
 M. N. Suresh
 Prakash
 Ramesh Bhat
 Sadhu Kokila
 Mandya Ramesh
 Master Santhosh

Production
For the film, a multi-storeyed glass house was built. Built just for the film at a cost of  80 lakh, it was an unusual experiment by the director and producer Ravichandran at the time, considering that a similar house was erected even for Ravichandran's previous film O Nanna Nalle. Close to 80% of the film's scenes were filmed in the house. EFX sound system was employed in the film for the first time in Kannada cinema and second overall.

Following the film's first theatrical release and a hostile response from the audience, close to 20 scenes of the film were re-shot and re-edit before giving it a re-release, a first of its kind in Kannada cinema.

Soundtrack

Ravichandran composed the film's background score, soundtracks and also wrote the lyrics for the tracks. The album consists of nine soundtracks. The album was released in late 2001, in Davangere, at an event.

Critical reception
The album was received well by critics upon release. But, for the lyrics, the album received appreciation. Amritamati S. of The Music Magazine reviewed the album and called it, "Symphonic grandeur on dumb lyrics". She added writing credits to the solo violin, guitar bits and the piano play among other highlights of the album. She concluded writing, "The quality of recording is excellent. Full marks to the string ensemble, and to the other instrumentalists. But you will be disappointed if you look for poetry, or even the street-smart variety of verse that Hamsalekha specialises in."

Awards
Karnataka State Film Awards 2001-02

Best Film - V. Ravichandran
Best Actor – V. Ravichandran
Best Music Director – V. Ravichandran
Best Sound Recording – L. Sathish
Karnataka State Film Award for Best Male Playback Singer – Rajesh Krishnan for "Nee Madid Thappa"

Aftermath
Having suffered from huge losses after the film failed commercially, Ravichandran took the blame for the film's failure. In an interview with Deccan Herald in December 2004, speaking of the film's failure, he said "it shattered him mentally and physically." The failure of the film influenced him hugely and his style of filmmaking.

References

2000s Kannada-language films
2000 films
Films directed by V. Ravichandran
Films scored by V. Ravichandran